Joe Musten is an American musician who started his musical career in 1999. He formed Beloved, Advent, Your Son Is Dead, and Torn. In 2008, he joined the band The Almost after former drummer Kenny Bozich quit the band. Joe was featured in the December 2009 issue of DRUM Magazine alongside former bandmate Aaron Gillespie. He formed  the band, Torn, and was featured on the self-titled debut album, but was un-credited.

Personal life
He is cousins with his bandmate, Dusty Redmon. Musten is married and has twins.

Bands
Current
 Advent - vocals (2004–2011, 2016–present)
 Beloved - drums (1999–2004, 2019-present)
 Ends of Sanity - drums (2021-present)

Former
 The Almost - drums (2008–2015)
 Public Rage - drums (1996-1999)
 Torn - vocals (2014–2015)
 Your Son Is Dead - drums (2012–2014)

Discography
Beloved
Garage Demos  (1999; Independent)
...And So It Goes (2000; Independent)
The Running Pre-Release Sampler (2001; Independent)
The Running (2001; Vindicated)
One Night Split (w/Luti-Kriss) (2002; Independent)
Failure On (2003; Solid State)
The Running (2004 reissue; Solid State)
 Beloved Live at Cat's Cradle (Live Album) – 2004 
Kiss It Goodbye: The Final Show (2005 DVD; Solid State)

Advent
Remove the Earth (2008; Solid State)
Naked and Cold (2009; Solid State)
Pain and Suffering (2016; Bridge 9)
The Almost
No Gift to Bring (2008; T&N)
Monster EP (2009; T&N)
Monster Monster (2009; T&N)
Fear Inside Our Bones (2013; T&N)

Your Son Is Dead
The Silver Cord EP (2012; Independent)

Torn
Torn (2014; Harm Reduction)

Guest Appearances
 "Across the Aisle" by Call To Preserve, on their album Life of Defiance (2010)
 "Nietzsche's Madness" by Living Sacrifice, on their album The Infinite Order (2010)
 "Finished People (Feat. Nate Rebolledo of Xibalba)" by Sleeping Giant, on their album Finished People (2014)
 "Casket Minds" by Dwell, on their EP Dwell (2014)
 "Immanuel (The Challenger)" & "Immanuel (The Redeemer)" by For Today, on their album Portraits (2009)
 "Scarlet Paint and Gasoline" by Glass Casket, on their album We Are Gathered Here Today (2004)
 "Sacrifice" by The Great Commission, on their album Cast the First Stone (2013)
 "In Absentia" by Reign Supreme, on their album, Testing the Limit of Infinite (2009)
 "Remember Me" by Poured Out, on the album, To the Point of Death (2016)

References 

Solid State Records artists
Christian metal musicians
Living people
American performers of Christian music
20th-century American musicians
21st-century American musicians
1983 births
The Almost members